Big Whale Cay Airport  is a public use airport located near Big Whale Cay, the Bahamas.

See also
List of airports in the Bahamas

References

External links 
 Airport record for Big Whale Cay Airport at Landings.com

Airports in the Bahamas